Pleurobranchus varians is a species of sea slug, a sidegill slug, a marine gastropod mollusc in the family Pleurobranchidae.

Taxonomy
The sister species (the closest relative) is Pleurobranchus areolatus from Caribbean. Those two species split 3.10 million years ago (Isthmus of Panama formed 3.1–3.4 Mya). Both species have color morphs and for their proper determination is useful the knowledge of locality.

Distribution
The distribution of P. varians include the Hawaiian Islands and Vanuatu. The type locality is Hawaiian Islands.

Description
P. varians was originally discovered and described by William Harper Pease in 1860. Pease' original text (the type description) reads as follow:

Ecology
All species in the genus Pleurobranchus are carnivorous.

References 
This article incorporates public domain text from the reference

External links

Pleurobranchidae
Gastropods described in 1860